Frank Williams Jr. (May 29, 1932 – July 13, 2006) was a gridiron football player who played for the BC Lions and Los Angeles Rams. His parents were Frank Williams and Elya M. Glenn of Texarkana, TX. He was one of four children. The nurses wrote his name incorrectly on the certificate, which read, Frank 'Jr.' Williams. He actually didn't have a middle name, he was a junior, named after his father, Frank Williams. He went by Frank James Williams or Frank J. Williams. He played college football at Pepperdine University. He was drafted to the Lions right out of Pepperdine.

Williams served as a sergeant in the United States Army during the Korean War. He had 6 children; which included Shelia Williams, Casandra Williams, and Michelle Williams. He died July 13, 2006, and is buried in Kent, King County, WA at Tahoma National Cemetery.

References

1932 births
2006 deaths
People from Texarkana, Texas
United States Army soldiers
African-American United States Army personnel
Players of American football from Texas
American football fullbacks
Canadian football running backs
African-American players of American football
African-American players of Canadian football
Pepperdine Waves football players
BC Lions players
Los Angeles Rams players
Burials at Tahoma National Cemetery
20th-century African-American sportspeople
21st-century African-American people
African Americans in the Korean War